Theroux is a French surname. Notable people with the surname include:

 Alexander Theroux (born 1939), American novelist, poet and essayist
 Gary Theroux, American radio personality, author and musicologist
 Justin Theroux (born 1971), American actor and screenwriter
 Paul Theroux (born 1941), American travel writer and novelist
 Marcel Theroux (born 1968), British novelist and broadcaster, son of Paul
 Louis Theroux (born 1970), British-American broadcaster, son of Paul
 Peter Theroux (born 1956), American translator and writer

See also
Thoreau (disambiguation)